Ouavoussé may refer to:

Ouavoussé, Méguet, Burkina Faso
Ouavoussé, Zoungou, Burkina Faso